Hegman is a surname. Notable people with the surname include:

Bob Hegman (born 1958), American baseball player
Mike Hegman (born 1953), American football player

See also
Hedman
Hegman Lake Pictograph, Native American pictograph, located on Hegman Lake in Minnesota, USA
Herman (name)